Eagle Academy is the name of several schools in the United States and other countries:

 Eagle Academy (Belle Glade), a boot camp–styled school or behavior modification facility in Belle Glade country, Florida
 Eagle Academy (Eagle, Idaho), an alternative high school in Eagle, Idaho
 Eagle Academy for Young Men, an all-boys' public middle school in the Bronx, New York

See also
 EAGLES Academy, a public high school for LGBT students in Hollywood, Los Angeles, California